Persipasi Bandung Raya U-20 (previously called Pelita Bandung Raya U-20) is an Indonesian football team located in Bandung, West Java, Indonesia. They are the reserve team from Persipasi Bandung Raya.

Current squad 
As of 18 October 2014.

Notable former players 

  Wawan Febrianto

Honours 

Indonesia Super League U-21 
 Champion: 2008–09
 Runner-up: 2009–10
 Third-place: 2012

References

External links
 Official site

Football
Football clubs in Indonesia